The 2019 Test Valley Borough Council election took place on 2 May 2019 to elect members of Test Valley Borough Council in England. This was on the same day as other local elections. The whole council was up for election on new boundaries, with the number of seats reduced from 48 across 24 wards to 43 across 20.

The Conservatives remained the largest party, with 24 seats out of the 22 required for a majority, and with the Liberal Democrats winning twelve seats across Romsey; a new localist party, the Andover Alliance, stood in the Andover Wards, winning a total of seven seats.

Summary

Election result

|-

Ward Results

Ampfield and Braishfield

Andover Downlands

Andover Harroway

Andover Millway

Andover Romans

Andover St Mary's

Andover Winton

Anna

Bellinger

Blackwater

Bourne Valley

Charlton and the Pentons

Chilworth, Nursling and Rownhams

Harewood

Mid Test

North Baddesley

Romsey Abbey

Romsey Cupernham

Romsey Tadburn

Valley Park

By-elections

North Baddesley

Andover Romans

Notes

References

2019 English local elections
May 2019 events in the United Kingdom
2019
2010s in Hampshire